Antonio Carafa, C.R. (died 1704) was a Roman Catholic prelate who served as Bishop of Ugento (1663–1704).

Biography
Antonio Carafa was ordained a priest in the Congregation of Clerics Regular of the Divine Providence.
On 24 May 1662, he was selected as Bishop of Ugento and confirmed by Pope Alexander VII on 12 February 1663.
On 18 February 1663, he was consecrated bishop by Giulio Cesare Sacchetti, Cardinal-Bishop of Sabina. 
He served as Bishop of Ugento until his death on 9 May 1704.

References

External links and additional sources
 (for Chronology of Bishops) 
 (for Chronology of Bishops) 

17th-century Italian Roman Catholic bishops
18th-century Italian Roman Catholic bishops
Bishops appointed by Pope Alexander VII
1704 deaths